Big $pender is a 1966 studio album by Peggy Lee. It was recorded with the orchestra of Bill Holman

Track listing 
 "Come Back to Me" (Burton Lane, Alan Jay Lerner) - 2:17
 "You've Got Possibilities" (Charles Strouse, Lee Adams) - 2:10
 "It's a Wonderful World" (Jan Savitt, Leo Watson, Harold Adamson) - 1:48
 "I'll Only Miss Him When I Think of Him" (Jimmy Van Heusen, Sammy Cahn) 	- 2:48
 "Big Spender" (Cy Coleman, Dorothy Fields) - 2:07
 "I Must Know" (Neal Hefti, Lil Mattis) - 2:48
 "Alright, Okay, You Win" (Sid Wyche, Mayme Watts) - 2:26
 "Watch What Happens" (Michel Legrand, Norman Gimbel) - 3:09
 "Touch the Earth" (Jeri Southern, Gail Allen) - 2:30
 "You Don't Know" (Walter Spriggs) - 2:37
 "Let's Fall in Love" (Harold Arlen, Ted Koehler) - 2:04
 "Gotta Travel On" (Paul Clayton) - 1:45

References 

1966 albums
Peggy Lee albums
Albums produced by Dave Cavanaugh
Capitol Records albums